Fishing in the Falkland Islands contributes to the  local economy, representing one of its biggest exports. Fish species range from golden sea tench to the rare triple tail shark. 
The official body responsible for the sustainable development of fisheries in the Falklands is the Falkland Islands Fisheries Department (FIS), established in 1987, It is reported that during 2013 the Loligo fishery had the best results.

History
The Fisheries law introduced in 1987 was substantially revised in 2005. Fish farming licenses were addressed in 2006 with the establishment of the Marine Farming Ordinance. According to a study conducted in 2008, the island fisheries were identified as one of the best in the world in terms of its scientific strength and environmentally enduring. As of 2014, the Falkland Islands do not have a national fishing license; however, there are daily catch limits per person per day: on the Murrell River, the daily limit is three trout, while everywhere else, it is six trout.

Production
Squid fishing has accounted for about 75% of the total yield of 200,000 tonnes, which is exported to Europe and the Far East. The other 25% includes finfish species such as Rock Cod, Hake, Hoki and Toothfish. Brown trout fishing is common, and fish caught can be particularly sizable; the record for the largest sea trout caught in the Falklands is held by Alison Faulkner at 22lbs 12.5 oz (roughly 10. 3 kg). 

D. gahi squid is exclusively fished in the island waters. The average annual revenue from fisheries is reported to be £20 million though during the recent years annual yields have declined to £12-15 million. Loligo gahi is an important squid species fished in the eastern and southern part called the "Falkland Shelf", in an area known as the "Loligo box".

The island is reported to have 20 ocean going fishing vessels and is capable of meeting 10% requirement of squid fishes in the world. There are special squid jigging vessels which can fish Illex argentinus squid. Trawlers are used for fishing Doryteuthis (gahi squid) are under the joint ownership of Falklands and European companies. Korean trawlers have fished here and found about 12 species of skates and rays which include Bathyraja griseocauda, Bathyraja albomaculata, Bathyraja brachyurops and Dipturus chilensis.

References

Falklands
Economy of the Falkland Islands
Falkland Islands